Scone Thoroughbreds is a country rugby league team, based in Scone, New South Wales, competing in the Group 21 competition under the auspices of the Country Rugby League.

The club is the most successful team in Rugby League history, winning 29 titles in its existence. The Thoroughbreds surpassed the South Sydney Rabbitohs in terms of 1st grade premierships in 1994.

In addition, they won the Clayton Cup once in 1974, and an undefeated club Premiership (2003).

Players successfully moving up to NRL from the club are John Morris, Darren Albert and Todd Lowrie, Noel and Les Cleal, and local legend Don "Bandy" Adams, all of whom have represented Australia.

The club plays its games at Scone Park, located along Hill Street, Scone. The club's colours are blue and white, using jerseys similar to that of the Canterbury Bulldogs.

In 2006, Scone won both the first grade and under 18s titles, defeating Singleton 26–6 and Aberdeen 10–6 respectively at Scone Park.
In 2018, with all four grades winning their grand finals, culminating in an upset victory over rivals Aberdeen Tigers 10–6 at Aberdeen.

On Saturday 7 September 2019 the first grade team convincingly beating Aberdeen 40-6 at Scone Park. In addition the ladies league tag was won 18-10 beating Murrurundi.

Premiership titles

Notable Juniors
Notable First Grade Players that have played at Scone Throughbreds include:
Don "Bandy" Adams
Rees Duncan
Les Cleal
Noel Cleal (1980–90 Eastern Suburbs & Manly Sea Eagles)
Darren Albert (1996-06 Newcastle Knights & Cronulla Sharks)
John Morris (2001–14 Newcastle Knights, Parramatta Eels, West Tigers & Cronulla Sharks)
Todd Lowrie (2003–15 Newcastle Knights, Parramatta Eels, Melbourne Storm, NZ Warriors & Brisbane Broncos)
Dane Tilse (2004–2016, Newcastle Knights, Canberra Raiders) and Hull Kingston Rovers
Adam Clydsdale (2013–2017Newcastle Knights & Canberra Raiders)
Cade Cust (2019- Manly Sea Eagles)
Jock Madden (2021- West Tigers)

References

 http://www.sconeadvocate.com.au/news/local/sport/other/scone-prepares-for-big-reunion/633179.aspx

https://www.scone.com.au/2019-winners-scone-thoroughbreds/

External links
Scone Thoroughbreds homepage

Rugby league teams in New South Wales